The Mustang 22 is an American trailerable sailboat that was designed by Martin Bludworth as a Midget Ocean Racing Club racer and first built in 1969.

The design is similar to the PlasTrend 22.

Production
The design was built by PlasTrend of Fort Worth, Texas, a company later known as Composite Technologies and then finally Island Yacht Corp. It was built from 1969 until 1973 in the United States, but it is now out of production.

Design
The Mustang 22 is a recreational keelboat, built predominantly of fiberglass. It has a fractional sloop rig or optional masthead sloop rig; a spooned, raked stem; a raised counter, reverse transom, an internally mounted spade-type rudder controlled by a tiller and a fixed stub keel with a split bulb, with a retractable centerboard, which is raised and lowered by a winch. It displaces  and carries  of ballast.

The boat is normally fitted with a small  outboard motor for docking and maneuvering.

The design has sleeping accommodation for four people, with a double "V"-berth in the bow cabin, a straight settee on the port side in the main cabin and an aft quarter berth on the port side. The galley is located on both sides just aft of the bow cabin. The optional galley may be equipped with a stove and a sink. The head is in the bow cabin under the "V"-berth.

For sailing downwind the design may be equipped with a symmetrical spinnaker.

Variants
Mustang 22
Mustang 22 MH

Operational history
In a 2010 review Steve Henkel wrote that the boat "has an unusual keel-centerboard arrangement, which includes a bulb on the keel ... combined with a centerboard slot splitting the keel in two. The centerboard, weighing 150 pounds, is cranked up and down using a winch mounted on the aft cabin bulkhead on the starboard side of the cockpit. A small inboard was optional, though we don’t see where it would fit in such a shallow hull. Best features: She looks sleek and fast, with her long cockpit and low profile. Worst features: Her buoyancy is low, due to her extended counter and pinched aft end thereby limiting weight at the back end, so her long cockpit is mostly unusable while racing. Her relatively narrow beam and low sitting headroom keep her from being a very comfortable cruiser—not that many owners would have cruising in mind, anyway. Finally, her diamond strut and 3/4 fractional rig give her an old-fashioned, outmoded look."

See also
List of sailing boat types

References

External links

Keelboats
1960s sailboat type designs
Sailing yachts
Trailer sailers
Sailboat type designs by Martin Bludworth
Sailboat types built by PlasTrend